The Spurn Point military railway was a railway line in the East Riding of Yorkshire, England. The line was built to supply military installations along this stretch of coast.

Spurn Point is a narrow spit of land which protrudes south and south-westwards from the eastern edge of Yorkshire into the Humber Estuary. It is shifting and unstable, being mostly composed of sand and shingle.

Opening and operation
Spurn Point had been militarised in 1805 during the Napoleonic Wars. When the First World War was declared, the number of military personnel on Spurn Point increased greatly overnight. The War Department decided that a railway line between Kilnsea and Spurn Point would be the best option for a supply chain and so purchased the land from the local land-owning family.

The line was constructed by C. J. Wills and Company with rails and other secondhand materials from the Great Central and Manchester, Sheffield and Lincolnshire Railways. The contractors also brought five standard gauge steam  locomotives (tank engines) to help build the line, one of which was left behind after to work the line. It opened in 1915 with the rails extending onto the jetty at Spurn Point. Transhipment of goods and materials from boats would then supply the fortifications and batteries along the stretch of railway up to Kilnsea. Rail transport was chosen as the roads in the area were narrow and twisting and supplies could be easily delivered by boat to the jetty. Whilst the jetty was only constructed to serve the railway building efforts, when the contractors left the War Department took over that too and left it in-situ.

Most trains were operated by small locomotives but some diesel and petrol railcars were used too, especially after the only resident locomotive (Kenyon - a Vulcan Foundry built engine) was scrapped in 1929. Local people who lived on the point used windpower to 'sail' small home made bogie wagons up and down the railway, with some notable crashes off the rails and into trains coming the other way. The line on occasion transported guns, with at least one incident where the train broke down at the narrowest point and the train was buffeted by the Humber on one side and the North Sea on the other.

The railway was isolated from the rest of the mainland railway network and was not furnished with stations. The line had a two-track engine shed a short distance north of the lighthouse.

Closure
The line closed in 1951 as a post-war time economy, being replaced by a road, which ironically was built with materials brought in by the railway. Spurn Head was also demilitarised in stages between 1956 and 1959, though many Cold War features were still extant further up the coast.

Apart from some small sections of rails sunk into tarmac and concrete, very little is left to show that this railway existed. The road sections with rails embedded in them get misaligned with the storms that batter the headland. This is what makes the remains of the railway look as if it is heading straight into the water.

Materials from the former road in the washover area, military and residential buildings and the railway are placed across parts of Spurn Head. These are used to reinforce parts around the washover section.

Notes

Citations

References

Further reading

External links

Military railways in the United Kingdom
Closed railway lines in Yorkshire and the Humber
Rail transport in the East Riding of Yorkshire
20th century in the East Riding of Yorkshire
World War I sites in England
1910s in the East Riding of Yorkshire